97th Brigade may refer to:

 97th Mixed Brigade (Spain); see 
 97th Guards Mechanized Brigade (Ukraine)
 97th Brigade (United Kingdom)